FC Gute, previously named Visby IF Gute, is a Swedish football club located in Visby on the island of Gotland. They currently play in the fourth-tier league Division 2 Norra Svealand.

Background

The club was formed in 1904 as Visby IF Gute, and in November 2007 changed name to the present name FC Gute. The club plays in the Division 2 Norra Svealand which is the fourth tier of the Swedish football league system. They play their home matches at the Gutavallen arena in Visby, but occasionally they play at an artificial pitch in Rävhagen, Visby called "Rävhagens konstgräs" if Gutavallen is unavailable.

FC Gute are affiliated to the Gotlands Fotbollförbund.

Season to season
Visby IF Gute FK played in the following divisions:

FC Gute have competed in the following divisions:

Attendances

In recent seasons FC Gute have had the following average attendances:

Footnotes

External links
 FC Gute – Official website

Sport in Visby
Football clubs in Gotland County
Association football clubs established in 2007
2007 establishments in Sweden